The 1965 Macdonald Brier, the Canadian men's national curling championship, was held from March 1 to 5, 1965 at Saskatoon Arena in Saskatoon, Saskatchewan. After the Brier the year before drew the smallest crowd since 1952, the 1965 Brier broke the attendance record at the time as a total of 52,319 fans attended the Brier. This attendance record would not be surpassed until 1970.

Team Manitoba, who was skipped by Terry Braunstein captured the Brier Tankard by finishing round robin play with a 9–1 record. This was Manitoba's first Brier championship since 1956 and their sixteenth Brier championship overall. Braunstein's rink would go on to represent Canada in the 1965 Scotch Cup in which they became the first Canadian team to not win gold as they were upset by the United States in the gold medal game.

Draw 9 between Alberta and Quebec saw the largest come from behind victory in Brier history. Alberta trailed 9-0 after the fifth end but Alberta outscored Quebec 16-3 in the last seven ends to win the game 16-12.

Draw 9 also saw two separate games go into a second extra end (14 ends) as Nova Scotia beat Newfoundland 11-9 and Ontario defeating New Brunswick 11-10. This was only the second and third time in Brier history that a second extra end would occur. The only other time this occurred was in 1955, which also featured Ontario and New Brunswick.

Event Summary
Heading into the Thursday evening draw, Manitoba lead the competition with an unbeaten record of 7-0 while Saskatchewan, heading into their bye was 7-1. Northern Ontario and Quebec were both 5-2 and Alberta was 5-3. In the Thursday evening draw, Northern Ontario handed Manitoba their first loss of the competition with a 12-6 victory while Quebec blew a 9-0 lead after five ends and lost to Alberta 16-12. Heading into the final day, both Manitoba and Saskatchewan were tied with 7-1 records with Northern Ontario one game behind with a 6-2 record with Alberta and Quebec still having an outside shot with 6-3 and 5-3 records respectively.

The Friday morning draw saw a major upset as Saskatchewan lost to a two-win Nova Scotia team 7-6 in which Saskatchewan lead 6-4 with two ends remaining. Northern Ontario stayed alive as they beat Quebec 8-6 while Manitoba took complete advantage of Nova Scotia's upset win and cruised to a 13-7 victory over Ontario to retake the Brier lead and be in the drivers seat heading into the final draw.

Heading into the final draw, both Northern Ontario and Saskatchewan would need to win and have Manitoba lose to force a tiebreaker against Manitoba. Northern Ontario would lead Alberta 8-5 heading into the tenth end, but Alberta would stage another come from behind win as they tied the game with three in the tenth. After the eleventh end was blanked, Alberta would seal Northern Ontario's fate with a steal of one in the final end for a 9-8 win. Saskatchewan would keep their hopes alive as they cruised past Prince Edward Island 11-8. However, Manitoba would clinch the Brier Tankard with a 10-7 win over British Columbia. BC kept it close until the eighth end when Manitoba would score five to take the lead for good.

Teams
The teams are listed as follows:

Round-robin standings

Round-robin results
All draw times are listed in Central Time (UTC-06:00)

Draw 1
Monday, March 1 3:00 PM

Draw 2
Monday, March 1 8:00 PM

Draw 3
Tuesday, March 2 9:30 AM

Draw 4
Tuesday, March 2 3:00 PM

Draw 5
Wednesday, March 3 3:00 PM

Draw 6
Wednesday, March 3 8:00 PM

Draw 7
Thursday, March 4 9:30 AM

Draw 8
Thursday, March 4 3:00 PM

Draw 9
Thursday, March 4 8:00 PM

Draw 10
Friday, March 5 9:30 AM

Draw 11
Friday, March 5 3:00 PM

Awards 
For the first time ever, an All-Star team was selected by the media.

References 

Macdonald Brier, 1965
The Brier
Sports competitions in Saskatoon
Curling in Saskatoon
Macdonald Brier
Macdonald Brier